Barnton may refer to:

Barnton, Cheshire, a village in Cheshire, United Kingdom
Barnton F.C., a football club located in Barnton, Cheshire
Christ Church, Barnton, a church located in Barnton, Cheshire
Barnton, Edinburgh, an area of Edinburgh, United Kingdom
Charlotte Baptist Chapel, also known as Barnton Baptist church, an independent church located in Barnton, Edinburgh
Barnton Quarry, a military bunker in Edinburgh